Oakley Farm, located at 11865 Sam Snead Highway (US 220) in Warm Springs, Virginia, includes the brick house named Oakley that was built starting in 1834, and completed before 1837, as a two-story side-passage form dwelling with a one-story front porch with transitional Federal / Greek Revival detail. It was later expanded and modified to a one-room-deep center passage plan dwelling with a two-story ell.

The house was expanded and remodeled to Colonial Revival style during 1921–22, "according to a design apparently conceived by the Staunton architectural firm T. J. Collins and Sons." A two-story kitchen and service wing was added.  Also on the property are a contributing laundry and wood house and a garage, both built in 1922; a 19th-century log cabin that may originally have served as a slave cabin; a Long Barn and a machinery shed (ca. 1905); two stables of Colonial Revival
design dating to the 1920s or early 1930s; and a fieldstone wall. It includes Federal and Greek Revival architecture. Oakley Farm was listed on the National Register of Historic Places in 2007.

References

Houses on the National Register of Historic Places in Virginia
Farms on the National Register of Historic Places in Virginia
Federal architecture in Virginia
Greek Revival houses in Virginia
Colonial Revival architecture in Virginia
Houses completed in 1837
Houses in Bath County, Virginia
National Register of Historic Places in Bath County, Virginia
U.S. Route 220
1834 establishments in Virginia
Slave cabins and quarters in the United States